Soultaker may refer to:
 Soultaker (film), a 1990 fantasy horror movie
 The SoulTaker, a 2001 anime miniseries
 Soultaker (EP), an EP by Blutengel
 Kama the Soultaker or Charles Wright, professional wrestler
 Soultaker, a fictional sword used by Katana in DC comics